Shipton's Arch (literally "Hole Mountain";  or simply ) is a conglomerate natural arch in China's Xinjiang Uyghur Autonomous Region.

It is probably the world's tallest natural arch. Though long familiar to locals (the south side of the arch is visible from the plain below) it was famously "discovered" in 1947 by English mountaineer Eric Shipton during his tenure as the British consul in Kashgar – and made known to the West in his book Mountains of Tartary. Shipton made unsuccessful attempts to reach the arch from the south but was defeated each time by a maze of steep canyons and cliffs. The arch once figured in the Guinness Book of Records for its exceptional height, but the editors of the book could not verify the location of the arch exactly, so the listing was dropped.

It was only as recently as May 2000 that an expedition sponsored by National Geographic rediscovered the arch for the outside world. Today, several companies operating out of Kashgar offer day trips to the arch for tourists.  The arch is about a one- to two-hour drive from Kashgar in addition to another one- to two-hour hike. It used to be that visitors were guided by locals and required to climb shaky ladders on their way to the arch but China has since invested money into a visitor's center, staircases and a viewing deck.

The Gobi March 2008, an international stage race, took competitors to the top of the arch during its seven-day, 250-kilometer footrace.

The height of the arch is estimated to be , about the height of the Empire State Building. The height depends upon what constitutes the base of the arch, which is either the base of the rubble pile (which is partially under the arch and where the span achieves its maximum width) or the floor of the west side canyon head,  lower.

References

Landforms of Xinjiang
Natural arches of China
Rock formations of China